The Angelim River is a river of Espírito Santo state in eastern Brazil.

See also
List of rivers of Espírito Santo

References
Brazilian Ministry of Transport

Rivers of Espírito Santo